Donatas Vėželis (born 1981) is a Lithuanian professional ballroom dancer. He is currently dancing with his partner Lina Chatkevičiūtė.

In 2014 Vėželis and Chatkevičiūtė won their first European title in standard show dance.

Awards 
In 2016 Lithuanian Sports department awarded Donatas Vėželis for merits in Lithuanian sport.

Personal life 
In 2014 Vėželis married his dancing partner Lina Chatkevičiūtė.

References

External links 
Donatas Vėželis at WDSF

Lithuanian ballroom dancers
Living people
Lithuanian male dancers
1981 births
Place of birth missing (living people)
Competitors at the 2009 World Games